Quetta Railway Station (Balochi: کوئٹہ اسٹیشن) is the main railway station of Quetta, Balochistan, Pakistan and serves as a major station on the Rohri-Chaman Railway Line and the eastern terminus of the Quetta-Taftan Railway Line.

History
Quetta was always considered a strategic city during the British Raj. The station was built during construction of the strategic line constructed by the Scinde, Punjab & Delhi Railway. Construction began in 1881 and opened to the public in 1887, which by then was part of the North Western State Railway. Quetta was always considered as an important strategic destination as Britain feared that the Russian Empire might advance from Afghanistan into Quetta, thereby threatening its rule in South Asia.In 1857, when the idea was suggested by William Andrew (Chairman of Scinde, Punjab & Delhi Railway) that a railway line be constructed through the Bolan Pass. On 18 September 1879 work begun on laying the railway tracks and after four months, the first 215 kilometres of line from Ruk to Sibi was completed and become operational in January 1881. Beyond Sibi, the terrain was very difficult. After immense difficulties and harsh weather conditions, the line reached Quetta in March 1887.

Train routes
The following trains stop/terminate/originate from Quetta station:

See also
 Pakistan Railways
 List of railway stations in Pakistan

References

Railway stations in Quetta District
Railway stations opened in 1887
Quetta
Railway stations on Quetta–Taftan Railway Line
Railway stations on Rohri–Chaman Railway Line
Railway stations in Balochistan, Pakistan